Almir Pandzo (born 2 September 1992) is a Bosnian-born Australian handball player.

Personal life
Because of the Bosnian War he migrated to Australia with his parents in the 1990s.

Career
Almir started his handball career at RK Iskra Bugojno and went on to represent the U17 SBK handball team in 2008. Pandzo has been part of the RK Iskra Handball team for a number of years (2008-2013). Pandzo was called in the national team first time for the 2013 World Cup in Spain. On the first preparation match Pandzo had an injury that took him out of the team  (ligament tear in his right hand fingers). Pandzo made his debut for the Australian national team on 22 Jan 2013 against Chile.

References
 AHF- Men's team

1992 births
Living people
Australian male handball players
People from Gornji Vakuf
Bosnia and Herzegovina emigrants to Australia